Caraguatay may refer to:

 Caraguatay, Misiones, Argentina
 Caraguatay, Paraguay
 Caraguatay District, Paraguay

Guaraní words and phrases